An efficiently updatable neural network (NNUE, a Japanese wordplay on Nue, sometimes stylised as ƎUИИ) is a neural network-based evaluation function whose inputs are piece-square tables, or variants thereof like the king-piece-square table. NNUE is used primarily for the leaf nodes of the alpha–beta tree. While being slower than handcrafted evaluation functions, NNUE does not suffer from the 'blindness beyond the current move' problem.

NNUE was invented by Yu Nasu and introduced to computer shogi in 2018. On 6 August 2020, NNUE was for the first time ported to a chess engine, Stockfish 12. Since 2021, all of the top rated classical chess engines such as Komodo Dragon have an NNUE implementation to remain competitive.

NNUE runs efficiently on central processing units without a requirement for a graphics processing unit (GPU). 

The neural network used for the original 2018 computer shogi implementation consists of four weight layers: W1 (16-bit integers) and W2, W3 and W4  (8-bit). W1 encoded the king's position and therefore this layer needed only to be re-evaluated once the king moved. It used incremental computation and single instruction multiple data (SIMD) techniques along with appropriate intrinsic instructions.

See also 
 elmo (shogi engine)
 Stockfish chess engine - The chapter about NNUE features a visualization of NNUE.
 List of chess software

References

External links 
 NNUE on the Chess Programming Wiki.
 NNUE evaluation functions for computer shogi on github.com

Evaluation methods
Neural networks
Japanese inventions
Computer shogi
Computer chess